Skolmen is a surname. Notable people with the surname include:

Christian Skolmen (born 1970), Norwegian actor and voice actor
Eli Skolmen Ryg (born 1936), Norwegian television producer
Jon Skolmen (1940–2019), Norwegian actor and comedian

Norwegian-language surnames